General William John Kerr, 5th Marquess of Lothian,  (13 March 1737 – 4 January 1815) was a British soldier and peer, styled Lord Newbattle until 1767 and Earl of Ancrum from 1767 to 1775. He was buried at St Andrew's parish Church, Farnham, Surrey on 19 January 1815.

He was the son of William Kerr, 4th Marquess of Lothian and succeeded to the title in 1775.

Marriage

He married Elizabeth, daughter of Chichester Fortescue of Dromisken, County Louth, and Elizabeth (née Wesley), on 15 July 1762. They had nine children.

Children
 William Kerr, 6th Marquess of Lothian (4 October 1763 – 27 April 1824)
 Lady Elizabeth Kerr (2 September 1765 – 13 August 1822), married John Dormer, 10th Baron Dormer, without issue
 Lady Caroline Sidney Kerr (8 September 1766 – 24 January 1829)
 Lady Mary Kerr (5 December 1767 – 6 February 1791), married Gen. Hon. Frederick St John and had issue
 Lady Louisa Kerr (30 November 1768 – 23 June 1819), who married Arthur Atherley on 2 June 1793 and had issue
 Lady Harriet Kerr (b. 12 October 1770; died young)
 Lord Charles Beauchamp Kerr (19 July 1775 – 2 March 1816), married Elizabeth Crump (d. 1830) and had issue
 Vice-Admiral Lord Mark Robert Kerr (12 November 1776 – 9 September 1840), married Charlotte Macdonnell, suo jure Countess of Antrim, and had issue
 Maj.-Gen. Lord Robert Kerr (14 September 1780 – 23 June 1843), married Mary Gilbert (d. 1861) and had issue

References

 

1737 births
1815 deaths
11th Hussars officers
12th Royal Lancers officers
18th Royal Hussars officers
5th Royal Irish Lancers officers
7th Dragoon Guards officers
British Army generals
British Life Guards officers
Knights of the Thistle
Royal Scots Greys officers
Scottish representative peers
Marquesses of Lothian